The 1997 Grand Prix de Denain was the 39th edition of the Grand Prix de Denain cycle race and was held on 24 April 1997. The race started in Raismes and finished in Denain. The race was won by Ludo Dierckxsens.

General classification

References

1997
1997 in road cycling
1997 in French sport